Robin Grossmann (born 17 August 1987) is a Swiss professional ice hockey defenseman who is currently playing for EHC Biel of the National League (NL).

Playing career
On October 18, 2013, while with HC Davos, Grossmann announced he would leave at season's end to sign a four-year contract with NLA competitors, EV Zug.

On July 27, 2021, Grossmann joined EHC Biel on a three-year deal through the 2023/24 season.

International play
Grossmann competed in the 2013 IIHF World Championship as a member of the silver winning Switzerland men's national ice hockey team.

Career statistics

Regular season and playoffs

International

References

External links
 

1987 births
Living people
EHC Biel players
HC Davos players
EHC Kloten players
Lausanne HC players
Swiss ice hockey defencemen
EV Zug players